Odd Riisnæs (born 12 May 1953) is a Norwegian jazz musician (saxophone) and composer. He was born in Oslo, Norway, the son of pianist Eline Nygaard Riisnæs and the younger brother of jazz saxophonist Knut Riisnæs. He is known from a series of releases and cooperations with the likes of Dag Arnesen, Arve Henriksen, Kjell Karlsen, Geir Lysne, Iver Kleive, Nils Petter Molvær, Jon Eberson, Terje Gewelt, Jon Balke, Audun Kleive and Oslo 13

Career 
Riisnæs was in different orchestras led by Terje Lie, Paul Weeden, Ditlef Eckhoff, Richard Badendyck, Per Husby, Ole Jacob Hansen/Harald Gundhus, Dag Arnesen, Jens Wendelboe, Kjell Karlsen and Jan Harrington. In the 1980s he played with the bands "Kråbøl", Oslo 13, "Radiostorbandet", "Lille Frøen Saksofonkvartett" and Dag Arnesen quintet.

Riisnes released two albums as a leader of Odd Riisnæs Quartett, with Dag Arnesen (piano),
Tom Olstad (drums) and Kåre Garnes (bass). Even more releases came with Odd Riisnæs Project and the musicians Pål Thowsen (drums), Bjørn Kjellemyr (bass) and Steinar Larsen (guitar).
Riisnæs has also been associated with Norges Musikkhøgskole as a lecturer in aural training.

Utgivelser

Solo albums 
As Odd Riisnæs Quartet with Dag Arnesen
1987: Speak low (Taurus Records)
1990: Thoughts (Taurus Records)

As Odd Riisnæs Project
1993: Another version (Taurus Records), with Iver Kleive (keyboards), Steinar Larsen (guitar), Terje Gewelt (Taurus Records) and Tom Olstad
1996: Your ship (1996)
2003: Another breeze (Hot Club Records, 2003), with guest artists like Sigmund Thorp and Jorunn Lovise Husan
2008: Another road (Ponca Jazz Records)

As sidemann 
With Per Eriksen
2000: Beat Crazy (Curling Legs)
2007: Beat Repeat (Curling Legs)

With others
1983: Anti-Therapy (Odin Records), with Oslo 13
2004: That's All (Jazzavdelingen), with Richard Badendyck

References

External links 

Norwegian jazz saxophonists
Norwegian jazz composers
ECM Records artists
Taurus Records artists
Ponca Jazz Records artists
1953 births
Living people
Musicians from Oslo
21st-century saxophonists
1300 Oslo members